Al-Qarni (also Al-Garni) is a surname. Notable people with the name include:

 Abdullah Al-Garni (born 1987), Saudi Arabian footballer
 Aid al-Qarni (born 1960), Saudi Islamic Muslim scholar, author, and activist
 Assaf Al-Qarni (born 1984), Saudi Arabian football goalkeeper
 Fawaz Al-Qarni (born 1992), Saudi Arabian football goalkeeper
 Issam Al-Qarni (born 1995), Saudi football player
 Mohamad Al-Garni (born 1992), Moroccan-born Qatari middle-distance runner
 Mohammed Al-Qarni (footballer, born 1981), Saudi Arabian footballer
 Mohammed Al-Qarni (born 1989), Saudi Arabian football midfielder
 Mohsen Al-Garni (born 1985), Saudi Arabian football midfielder
 Musa al-Qarni, mufti of Osama bin Laden

See also
 Garni (disambiguation)